The Canadian Champion is a locally distributed community newspaper in Milton, Ontario, Canada. It is published biweekly by Metroland Media Group.

History
It was founded as The Canadian Champion and County of Halton Intelligencer in 1861 by James A. Campbell, and it was known for its outspoken political views. In 1862, it declared:

Campbell sold the newspaper in 1864 to Robert Matheson and Isaac Hunter. Hunter would leave in 1866 to found the Halton Herald in Georgetown, Ontario. From 1869 to 1882, the paper would see a succession of owners, until settling with the partnership of William Panton and David Watson Campbell. That would last until Campbell's sudden death in 1896. Panton would continue as sole publisher until he sold the Champion to John W. Blight and F. Leonard White in 1927.

After Blight's death, the Champion was sold to G. Arlof Dills, publisher of The Acton Free Press, in November 1943. Dills stated, "It will be our aim to make the two papers as distinct as the needs of the two communities."

The Champion would remain in the ownership of the Dills family until 1978, when it would be sold to Inland Publishing, which would later merge with Metrospan Community Newspapers{{efn|a subsidiary of Torstar Corporation}} in 1981 to form Metroland.

Other Milton newspapers
The Champion was not the only newspaper covering Milton events. The Halton Journal had already begun in 1855, but there is no record of when it ceased publication. The Halton New Era was published in the early 1860s, and the Halton News ran for a short time from 1877. The Milton Reformer was the most successful competitor, being published from 1885 to 1932, until selling its subscription list to the Champion''.

Notes and references

Notes

References

Weekly newspapers published in Ontario
Newspapers established in 1861
1861 establishments in Ontario
Torstar publications